Evan King and Hunter Reese were the defending champions but chose not to defend their title.

Adam Pavlásek and Igor Zelenay won the title after defeating Domagoj Bilješko and Andrey Chepelev 4–6, 6–3, [10–2] in the final.

Seeds

Draw

References

External links
 Main draw

Zagreb Open - Doubles
2022 Doubles